Shabnam Surayyo (also spelled as Surayo, Suraya, or Soraya) is a Tajik singer.

Life
Surayyo was born into a musical family, with both her mother Surayyo Qosimova and sister Farzonai Khurshed also singers in her country.

In 2006 one of her singles was ranked No.1 in her country. She is popular in Afghanistan because she works with singers from this country and also covers their songs, either together with the original artists or with their permission, for example, her duets with Jawid Sharif or Najib Nawabi.

Shabnam also collaborated with Afghan singer Jawid Sharif on a duet called Ey Khuda. In addition, she has also performed duets with other famous Tajik singers such as Suhrobi Safarzod, Parvina Shukrulloeva, and others. She also sang in Leila Forouhar’s concert in Tajikistan in 2006.

References

1981 births
Living people
Dance-pop musicians
Tajik-language singers
Persian-language singers
Tajikistani women singers
People from Khatlon Region
Traditional pop music singers
21st-century Tajikistani singers
21st-century Tajikistani women singers